Smyrna is a city in Cobb County, Georgia, United States. It is located northwest of Atlanta, and is in the inner ring of the Atlanta Metropolitan Area. It is included in the Atlanta-Sandy Springs–Alpharetta MSA, which is included in the Atlanta–Athens-Clarke–Sandy Springs CSA. 

From 2000 to 2012, Smyrna grew by 28%. Historically it is one of the fastest-growing cities in the state, and one of the most densely populated cities in the metropolitan area. In the 2020 Census, Smyrna's population was 55,663.

Smyrna was ranked #44 in Moneys 2018 survey of "The Best Places to Live in America" for balancing economic growth, affordability, and quality of life.

History
Pioneers began settling the area in 1832. By the late 1830s, a religious encampment called Smyrna Camp Ground had become a popular travel destination and was well known throughout Georgia. It is a Greek name for the Biblical city of Smyrna, modern day Izmir in Turkey, the home of the Christian martyr Polycarp. After the completion of the Western and Atlantic Railroad in 1842, the area began to grow. It was known by several names until 1872—Varner's Station, Ruff's Siding, Neal Dow, and Ruff's Station. The city was incorporated with the name Smyrna in 1872.

Two Civil War battles occurred in the area, the Battle of Smyrna Camp Ground and the Battle of Ruff's Mill, both on July 4, 1864. The area's businesses, homes, and 1849 covered bridge (since rebuilt and still in use today) were burned by Sherman's troops.

The nearby Bell Bomber plant that produced B-29 bombers during World War II was reopened by Lockheed in 1951, and became a catalyst for growth. The city's population grew during the next two decades, from 2,005 in 1950 to almost 20,000 by 1970.

Geography
Smyrna is located just west of the northern intersection of I-285 and I-75, which is the site of the edge city Cumberland and the Cobb Galleria. 

Smyrna is bordered by Vinings to the east, Marietta to the north and west, and Mableton to the south and southwest. The city of Sandy Springs and the affluent Atlanta neighborhoods of Paces and Buckhead are approximately within 10 miles of Smyrna's center.

The general terrain of the area is characteristic of the Piedmont region of Georgia, characterized by hills with broad ridges, sloping uplands, and relatively narrow valleys.

Flora
The city's official symbol is the jonquil (a flower). Known as the "Jonquil City", it derives this name from the thousands of jonquils that flourish in gardens and along the streets in early spring.

Climate

Demographics

2020 census

As of the 2020 United States census, there were 55,663 people, 24,736 households, and 13,669 families residing in the city.

2018
At the 2018 census, there were 56,271 people, with 35% growth since 2000. There were 23,002 households. The racial make-up of the city was 29.3% African American, 46% White, 0.4% Native American, 7.71% Asian, 0.10% Pacific Islander and 3.1% from two or more races. 14.9% of the population were Hispanic or Latino of any race.

The population was distributed by age as follows: 22.6% under the age of 18, 18.8% from 18 to 29, 20% from 30 to 39, 14.9% from 40 to 49, 14.2% from 50–64, and 9.5% who were 65 years of age or older. The median age was 33 years. For every 100 females, there were 92.2 males.

52.6% of Smyrna residents lived in families with an average of 2.2 people per household.

In 2012, 52.2% of Smyrna residents had a college degree and 91.3% of residents had a high school diploma. This is one of the highest rates in the state of Georgia.

Government

Municipal
The city is governed by a seven-member council, elected by wards, and a mayor elected at-large. Max Bacon served as the mayor of Smyrna starting in 1985; in July 2019 he announced his retirement from city politics. The current mayor is Derek Norton, who took office January 6, 2020. Norton previously served on the City Council since 2015.

The city operates the Smyrna Public Library, the only library in the county which is not a part of the Cobb County Public Library System.

Economy

Personal income
The median household income in 2018 was $73,788. The per capita income was $44,823, a 24.7% increase from 2000. 

In 2018, the place with the highest median household income in Smyrna was census tract 312.09, with a value of $143,443, followed by census tracts 311.12 and 311.17, with respective values of $108,229 and $89,769.

Industry
The Atlanta Bread Company has its headquarters in Smyrna.

Companies with an office include Eaton Corporation and IBM. Smyrna was the site of the corporate offices of the now-defunct World Championship Wrestling.

Top employers
According to the City's 2010 Comprehensive Annual Financial Report, the top employers in the city are:

On October 31, 2014, Emory Healthcare closed the Emory Adventist Hospital at Smyrna.  They have since announced plans to renovate and reopen the hospital.

Private projects

In 1991, the city began a community redevelopment project known as "Market Village," in order to create a well-defined downtown. Included were a community center and  public library. A mixed retail and residential district was modeled after an early 1900s city village, including a square with a fountain. This, and other expansions have revitalized the downtown area. Further redevelopment has occurred throughout the city—including thousands of new homes – mostly cluster homes, townhouse and condo communities replacing older neighborhoods. The population has risen as a result of redevelopment, a few annexations, and Smyrna's location as a residential suburb in the Northwest center of metro Atlanta.

There are additional mixed retail/residential/office redevelopments near the city center, including Jonquil Plaza, Belmont Hills plaza, and The Crossings.

Public projects 
In September 2019, the James M. Cox Foundation gave $6 million to the PATH Foundation, which will connect the Silver Comet Trail terminus in Smyrna to the Atlanta Beltline. It is expected to be completed by 2022. The combined length of the Silver Comet and the Beltline will make it the longest paved trail surface in the U.S., totaling approximately 300 miles (480 kilometers); one could travel from Atlanta to Anniston, Alabama via the trail alone.

Media outlets 
Smyrna and Vinings' community newspaper is  The Bright Side. It is dedicated to publishing positive events that occur in Cobb County.

Education

Public schools
Public schooling in Smyrna falls under the jurisdiction of the Cobb County School District. The city's students are served by 12 of the district's schools. The largest schools by enrollment are:

Campbell High School
Campbell Middle School
Nickajack Elementary School

Private schools
Several private schools are inside Smyrna's city limits, including St. Benedict's Episcopal School, Covenant Christian School, Whitefield Academy, and a satellite campus of Buckhead Preparatory Academy.

Arts and culture

Market Village in the city center often has open-air concerts and festivals. There are also various small parks such as Cobb Park, public pools such as Aline Wolfe Center for the elderly and Tolleson park pool for all ages, tennis courts and playgrounds and a linear park with walking trail along Spring Road.

Transportation
Several major roadways, such as I-285, Cobb Parkway (U.S. Route 41), Atlanta Road (Old State Route 3), and South Cobb Drive (State Route 280), pass through the municipality.

Smyrna is served by CobbLinc and MARTA public buses.

Notable people
 Chan Marshall, singer-songwriter, musician, better known as Cat Power
 U.S. Representative Bob Barr;
 Julia Roberts, actress
 Gerald Perry and Ron Gant, baseball stars who both played infield for the Atlanta Braves
 Daniel Palka, baseball player with the New York Mets
 John Brebbia, baseball player with the San Francisco Giants
 Louie Giglio, Passion City Church Senior Pastor/Passion Conferences and sixstepsrecords founder
 Tay Glover-Wright, American  football player
 C. Martin Croker, voice-over actor and animator was born in Smyrna. He is best known for his work on the cult classic show Space Ghost Coast to Coast
 Kelly Nelon Clark,recording artist and actress, was a long time resident and calls Smyrna her hometown
 Benn Jordan, recording artist and composer, owns a home and recording studio in Smyrna.
  Pat Terry, recording artist and composer, is a lifelong resident of Smyrna.
 Eschel Rhoodie, the South African Secretary of the Department of Information from 1972 to 1977, resided in Smyrna after emigrating to the United States.
 645AR, rapper, raised partly in Smyrna

In popular culture 
The restaurant scene in the film Joyful Noise was shot at Howard's Restaurant in Smyrna in 2011.

References

External links

 City of Smyrna official website
 Comprehensive History of Smyrna, Georgia (1832–present) from the Smyrna Historical and Genealogical Society

Cities in Georgia (U.S. state)
Cities in Cobb County, Georgia
Populated places established in 1872
Cities in the Atlanta metropolitan area